Kingwood is the sixth album by Swedish punk rock band Millencolin, released on 30 March 2005 in Sweden and 12 April 2005 in North America. The song "Farewell My Hell" originated as an idea for singer Nikola Sarcevic's first solo album, but was used for Kingwood instead. "Farewell My Hell" was played prominently in the Swedish vampire comedy horror film Frostbite.

Release
On 26 January 2005, Kingwood was announced for release in two months' time. On 1 March 2005, "Biftek Supernova" was posted online for free download. The music video for "Ray" was posted online on 8 March 2005; the track was released as the album's lead single eight days later. Kingwood was released in Europe on 28 March 2005, and in the United States on 14 April 2005. They went a tour of Europe with Street Dogs and the Lawrence Arms in April 2005, which was followed by on a West Coast US tour the following month with Boys Night Out and Roses Are Red. Between mid June and mid August, the group went on the 2005 edition of Warped Tour. Two singles from the album were released: "Ray" and "Shut You Out".

Track listing
All songs written by Nikola Sarcevic and Mathias Färm, except where noted.
 "Farewell My Hell" (Sarcevic) - 2:52
 "Birdie" - 2:32
 "Cash or Clash" (Sarcevic) - 2:40
 "Shut You Out" - 3:39
 "Biftek Supernova" (Sarcevic) - 2:18
 "My Name is Golden" - 3:08
 "Ray" - 2:52
 "Novo" - 2:58
 "Simple Twist of Hate" - 1:29
 "Stalemate" - 3:18
 "Mooseman's Jukebox" - 2:12
 "Hard Times" (Sarcevic) - 4:09
 "Phony Tony" (Japanese release only) - 2:59

Personnel

Millencolin
Nikola Sarcevic - lead vocals, bass
Erik Ohlsson - guitar
Mathias Färm - guitar
Fredrik Larzon - drums

References

External links

Kingwood at YouTube (streamed copy where licensed)

Millencolin albums
2005 albums
Epitaph Records albums
Burning Heart Records albums